Russell M. Little House is a historic home located at Glens Falls, Warren County, New York.  It was built about 1876 and is a three bay, two story frame residence sheathed in clapboards.  It has an eclectic design with elements of Italianate and Carpenter Gothic design.

It was added to the National Register of Historic Places in 1984.

See also
 National Register of Historic Places listings in Warren County, New York

References

Houses on the National Register of Historic Places in New York (state)
Gothic Revival architecture in New York (state)
Houses completed in 1876
Houses in Warren County, New York
National Register of Historic Places in Warren County, New York